Pain of Love is a 1992 Danish dramatic tragedy written and directed by Nils Malmros. It stars Anne Louise Hassing and Søren Østergaard in a beautiful but bitter story about a young college student whose small setbacks in school and relationships lead her toward an inexorable descent into suicidal depression.

Cast 
 Anne Louise Hassing ... Kirsten
 Søren Østergaard ... Søren
 Birthe Neumann ... Kirstens mor
 Waage Sandø ... Kirstens far
  ... Inge-Lise
  ... Anders
  ... Julie
  ... Lasse
 Ove Pedersen ... Psychology Examiner
 Mads-Peter Neumann ... Psychology Monitor
  ... Psychology Monitor
 Karin Flensborg ... Examiner

Awards 
The film won the 1993 Robert for Best Film, and became the only film in Danish cinema to sweep the Bodil Awards with wins for Best Danish Film and for all four acting categories. It was also nominated for the Golden Bear at the 43rd Berlin International Film Festival.

References

External links 
 Allmovie
 IMDb
 The Danish Film Database (In Danish)
 

1992 drama films
1992 films
Best Danish Film Bodil Award winners
Best Danish Film Robert Award winners
Danish drama films
1990s Danish-language films
Films directed by Nils Malmros
Swedish drama films
1990s Swedish films